Owain Phyfe (April 9, 1949 – September 5, 2012) was a vocalist, instrumentalist, composer, and the founder of Nightwatch Recording, which concentrates on Renaissance and Medieval music. He lived in Berkley, Michigan, United States, often playing at O'Mara's Restaurant when he wasn't traveling the Renaissance circuit. He died from pancreatic cancer on September 5, 2012. The following day performers and fans held an all night wake in his honor.

Early years
Phyfe grew up in a bilingual family with Welsh as a second language. Phyfe started and ran an automotive engineering company for nearly ten years.  In 1992, however, nourished by his grandparents' appreciation for song, Phyfe's study of languages in college and his travels abroad to England, France, Mexico, and Spain as well as his experience later as a musician in New York City's Greenwich Village, he sold the company and turned to music as a full-time profession.

Beginnings
In the mid-1980s, Phyfe and his wife Paula became festival performers at the Michigan Renaissance Festival. Spellbound by early music, Phyfe decided to develop a "singer of songs" persona. While researching late medieval and renaissance music, he found himself favoring faire life over the automotive engineering company he had started in 1983. "It became my dream to present the beauty of Renaissance music," Phyfe explained, "not as a documentary, but as a living expression."

Musical career
He teamed up with the magical Renaissance Fair jam band CANTIGA in 1990 to form The New World Renaissance Band, specializing in the performance of ancient music in English, Spanish, Italian, Welsh, German, French, Provençal and Latin. He has also toured with Richie Blackmore and Candice Night. He played many traditional instruments including his favored instrument, the chitarra battente, as well as recorders, viola, cello, fiddle, and harp. He performed across the U.S., and his music has aired worldwide and on over 250 radio stations across North America. He performed and offered workshops at folk festivals, medieval recreationist, musical and Neo-Pagan events including the S.C.A.'s Pennsic War, The SCA's "Gulf Wars" event, where he performed solo and also with Wolgemut at the Green Dragon Tavern the Michigan Renaissance Festival, Sirius Rising, Pagan Spirit Gathering and the Starwood Festival, both as a soloist and with the New World Renaissance Band. He also contributed to the soundtrack of the Wim Wenders film Pina

Partial discography

Owain Phyfe
 1995 - Sweet Was the Song (with L'Ensemble Josquin) (Nightwatch Recording)
 1999 - Poets, Bards, & Singers of Song (Nightwatch Recording)
 2006 - Lágrimas de Sangría (Tears of Sangria) (Nightwatch Recording)

New World Renaissance Band
 1992 - Live the Legend (Nightwatch Recording) 
 1995 - Where Beauty Moves and Wit Delights (Nightwatch Recording) 
 1996 - Odyssey (Nightwatch Recording) 
 2002 - Tales From the Vineyard (Nightwatch Recording)

Soundtrack
 2011 - Pina, Director: Wim Wenders, song:

Critical reception
Live the Legend made the year-end bestseller list for classical releases at a number of retail chains across the midwest, including Streetside Records and Harmony House, and ranked #13 nationwide on Public Radio Music Source's classical best-seller list.

Reviewing a performance in St. Louis, the St. Louis Post-Dispatch said, "the fact that the group's sound was nearly as seamless live as it was coming out of the recording studio is impressive in the extreme, especially since the band's first two releases, "Live the Legend" and "Where Beauty Moves and Wit Delights," are outstanding musically and acoustically... The group's leader, Owain Phyfe, handles the foreign language lyrics of many of the songs as easily as he does the English (a skill many opera singers would do well to emulate)."

Awards
1997 Cessez Mortels de Soupirer (Sigh no More, Mortals) - Best Music Video: Ohio's National Telly Awards
1997 Cessez Mortels de Soupirer (Sigh no More, Mortals) - Best Music Video: International Communicator Awards
2003  Texas Renaissance Festival: The Phillip Hafer (King Henry) Memorial MVP Award

Performance reviews
 Revue Magazine June 1995
 Detroit Monthly March 1996
 WKBD-TV News Spotlight May 26, 1996

Album reviews
 Sunday Oakland Press March 3, 1996
 Shakespeare Oxford Newsletter Sept. 1997
 Magical Blend 1998 Issue #62
 Detroit Free Press Sept. 19th, 1999
 The Mists of Avalon - WDVR-FM
 [http://www.atthefaire.com/articles/2001/06-20-01_owain_poets_CD.htm Review of Owain Phyfe's Poets, Bards and Singers of Song by Willa, 'At The Fair Staff Writer (June 20, 2001)]

References

Further reading
Autobiography from concert program insert
: Owain Phyfe by Joe Guppy in Live Journal, Sept. 9, 2012
In Remembrance of the Bard, Owain Phyfe in RenFestHQ (Sept, 6, 2012)
 Bielefeld, Robert (2006) Cantiga's Renaissance Festival Favorites'' (Mel Bay Publications)
A sad goodbye to Owain Phyfe
Owain Phyfe - the 12th-16th century rock god by Sally A. Schwartz in DaBelly Magazine, 2008

External links
 http://www.myspace.com/owainphyfe
 http://www.nightwatchrecording.com
 http://www.owainphyfe.com

Renaissance fair performers
American male singer-songwriters
American male composers
American composers
1949 births
2012 deaths
People from Berkley, Michigan
Singer-songwriters from Michigan